Grits are a type of porridge made from boiled cornmeal. Hominy grits are a type of grits made from hominy – corn that has been treated with an alkali in a process called nixtamalization, with the pericarp (ovary wall) removed. Grits are often served with flavorings as a breakfast dish.  Grits can be savory or sweet, with savory seasonings being more common. Grits are similar to other thick maize-based porridges from around the world, such as polenta and mieliepap. The dish originated in the Southern United States but is now available nationwide. Grits are often part of a dinner entrée shrimp and grits, served primarily in the South.

The word "grits" is derived from the Old English word , meaning "coarse meal." In the Charleston, South Carolina, area, cooked hominy grits were primarily referred to as "hominy" until the 1980s.

Origin 
The dish originated with the Native American Muscogee tribe using a corn similar to hominy. American colonists learned to make the dish from the Native Americans, and it quickly became an American staple.

At that time, the hominy for grits was ground on a stone mill. The ground hominy was passed through screens, the finer sifted material used as grit meal, and the coarser as grits.

Three-quarters of the grits sold in the U.S. are bought in the South, in an area stretching from Lower Texas to Washington, D.C., that is sometimes called the "grits belt."  The state of Georgia declared grits to be its official prepared food in 2002.  A similar bill was introduced in South Carolina to name it the official state food, but it did not advance. Nevertheless, South Carolina still has an entire chapter of legislation dealing exclusively with corn meal and grits. State law in South Carolina requires grits and rice meal to be enriched, similar to the requirement for flour.

Grits may be either yellow or white, depending on the color of the corn used.  The most common version in supermarkets is "quick" grits, which have the germ and hull removed.  Whole kernel grits are sometimes called "speckled".

Preparation 

Grits are prepared by mixing water or milk and cornmeal and stirring them over heat. Whole grain grits require much longer to become soft than "quick grits."

Dishes 
Grits are eaten with a wide variety of foods, such as eggs and bacon, fried catfish, shrimp, salmon croquettes, or country ham.

Shrimp and grits is a traditional dish in the coastal communities in the South Carolina Lowcountry and Georgia's Lower Coastal Plain. 

Solidified cooked grits can be sliced and fried in vegetable oil, butter, or bacon grease, or they can first be breaded in beaten egg and bread crumbs.

See also 

 Creamed corn
 Cuisine of the Southern United States
 Cuisine of the United States
 Farina (food)
 Groats
 Hasty pudding
 List of porridges
 Mush (cornmeal)
 Polenta
 Three Sisters (agriculture)

References 

Native American cuisine
Porridges
Cuisine of the Southern United States
Native American cuisine of the Southeastern Woodlands
Bahamian cuisine
Soul food
Staple foods
Maize dishes
Symbols of Georgia (U.S. state)
Muscogee culture
Cuisine of the Thirteen Colonies